David Henry "Harry" Pugh (8 March 1875 – 1945) was a Welsh footballer who played in the English Football League for Lincoln City and Stoke. He was also capped seven times to the Wales national team between 1896 and 1901, and scored two goals for the team.

Career
Pugh was born in Wrexham and played for local clubs Wrexham Grosvenor and Wrexham. He joined Stoke in 1897 and played 20 matches for the club scoring once. He left for Lincoln City in March 1898 and he became a regular for the "Imps" in the Second Division playing 97 matches for the club scoring 12 goals in four years.

Pugh made seven appearances for Wales and scored two goals. He played his first match on 29 February 1896 against Ireland and his last match on 18 March 1901 against England.

Career statistics

Club
Source:

International
Source:

References

Welsh footballers
Lincoln City F.C. players
Stoke City F.C. players
Wrexham A.F.C. players
English Football League players
1875 births
1945 deaths
Association football forwards
Wales international footballers
Wrexham Grosvenor F.C. players